On Stage and in the Movies is Dionne Warwick's seventh album for Scepter Records, and was recorded and released on May 14, 1967. The LP was issued as number 559 in the Scepter Catalog.

History
The cover art for this LP was simple: Warwick in a multicolored gown against a black background.  As mentioned in the liner notes of the Rhino Records 1984 collection Dionne Warwick Anthology, this LP was one of three concept albums recorded by Warwick during her tenure with Scepter.  The other two albums identified in the notes are Soulful and The Magic of Believing.

While there were no hit singles from this album, some of the songs that were featured were "Summertime"; a humorous reading of "Anything You Can Do" (alongside an uncredited Chuck Jackson); "You'll Never Walk Alone"; "Something Wonderful", and "Baubles, Bangles, and Beads".

The album, like most of Warwick's Scepter work, was arranged by Burt Bacharach and produced by Bacharach and Hal David; however, none of the material on the album was written by the songwriting duo.

Track listing

Personnel
Dionne Warwick - vocals
Garry Sherman, Ray Ellis, Burt Bacharach - arrangements
John Lakata, Phil Ramone - audio engineer
Burt Goldblatt - art direction, cover design

References

External links
On Stage and in the Movies at Discogs

Dionne Warwick albums
1967 albums
albums arranged by Burt Bacharach
albums arranged by Ray Ellis
Albums produced by Burt Bacharach
Albums produced by Hal David
Scepter Records albums